Jeanne Clare Adams (June 15, 1921 – April 21, 2007) was an American computer scientist. She was Chairman of the ANSI X3J3 Fortran Standards Committee that "developed the controversial Fortran 8X proposal".

She graduated with a BS in economics from the University of Michigan in 1943, and an MS in telecommunications and electrical engineering from the University of Colorado in 1979. Her longest held position was at the National Center for Atmospheric Research, Boulder, Colorado, from 1960 to 1981, serving from 1984 to 1997 as deputy head of the Computing Division. Adams was also chair of the International Standards Organization Committee on Programming Languages (TC97/SC5), now ISO/IEC JTC 1/SC 7 and the ANSI Fortran Standards Committee (X3J3). Adams wrote reference manuals for computer equipment such as the CYBER 205.

Selected publications
Adams, Jeanne C., Walter S. Brainerd, and Charles H. Coldberg, Programmer's Guide to Fortran 90, McGraw-Hill, New York, 1990.
Adams, Jeanne C., Walter S. Brainerd, J. Martin, B. Smith, and J. Wagener, Fortran 90 Handbook, McGraw-Hill, New York, 1992.

References

American women computer scientists
Fortran
University of Michigan College of Literature, Science, and the Arts alumni
University of Colorado Boulder alumni
1921 births
2007 deaths
American computer scientists
20th-century American scientists
20th-century American women scientists
21st-century American women